Baeolidia salaamica, is a species of sea slug, an aeolid nudibranch. It is a marine gastropod mollusc in the family Aeolidiidae.

References

External links

Aeolidiidae
Gastropods described in 1982